Dhanmondi Tutorial (DT) is a private, English-medium school in the Dhanmondi residential area of Dhaka, Bangladesh. It was founded in 1972. As of 2016, it teaches approximately 1500 students from kindergarten through A Levels. Classes are divided into a junior and a senior section, each of which has its own campus.

Curriculum 
DT follows the British GCE and IGCSE syllabus and the students are taught for the Ordinary Level (O-level) and Advanced Level (A-level) examinations conducted by Edexcel International.

Extracurricular activities 
DT regularly competes in school handball tournaments. In 2004, they reached the finals of the Maple Leaf Mini Handball Tournament (girls), but lost to Maple Leaf. The same year, DT took third place in the 14th Bata School Handball Tournament (girls), edging BIS, and third place in the Sunnydale Mini Handball Tournament (boys), defeating BAF Shaheen College in sudden death overtime. Two years later, they again finished third in the Sunnydale Mini Handball Tournament (boys), beating Ansar VDP School.

In 2010, the school reached the finals of the Sunnydale Mini Handball Tournament (boys), but lost to Sunnydale School. Later that year, the handball squad travelled to Nepal to play four exhibition matches.

In 2014, the school reached the final of the Polar Ice Cream 22nd School Handball Tournament (boys), but was beaten by St Gregory's High School.

DT also engages in competitive debating, participates in Bangladesh Scouts, and has a Model United Nations club, among other extracurricular activities.

References

Dhanmondi
Schools in Dhaka District
Educational institutions established in 1972
1972 establishments in Bangladesh